Coniglio is an Italian surname derived from the Latin cuniculus, meaning "rabbit". Notable people with the surname include:

 Angelo F. Coniglio (born 1936), Sicilian-American civil engineer
 Fernando Coniglio (born 1991), Argentine football player 
 Giuseppe Coniglio (1922–2006), Italian poet
 Joseph Coniglio (born 1943), American politician
 Mark Coniglio (born 1961), American composer
 Stephen Coniglio (born 1993), Australian football player
 Agnaldo Coniglio Rayol (born 1938), Brazilian singer and actor

See also
 Coney (disambiguation)

Italian-language surnames
Surnames from nicknames